Jane Lawton (May 24, 1944 – November 29, 2007) was an American politician from Maryland and a member of the Democratic Party. The Jane E. Lawton community center, located in Leland Park in Chevy Chase, MD, was renamed in her memory on June 14, 2009.

Early life and education
Lawton was born in Muskogee, Oklahoma on May 24, 1944, to Clarence and Ruth Alice England.

Lawton attended the University of Oklahoma where she graduated Phi Beta Kappa.

Career
After college she worked briefly for IBM. She also worked as Special Assistant to the Speaker of the United States House of Representatives Carl Albert until the birth of her first child in 1974. She became a member of the Town of Chevy Chase Town Council in 1981, later becoming treasurer, then Chairperson (this position is now referred to as the Mayor of the Town). Later, she was Special Assistant to Neil Potter when he was County Executive of Montgomery County. After Doug Duncan succeeded Potter, she became the County Cable Administrator. In the State Legislature, she was originally appointed to fill the seat of former delegate John Hurson, but was elected in her own right in the fall of 2006. She passed two bills during her brief time in office. The following session, two more bills were passed in her name, one of which was a Farms-to-Schools program she had been working on the previous session and planned to introduce during the 2008 legislative session. She also served on the Environmental Matters Committee while in the House.

Legislative notes
 voted for the Healthy Air Act in 2006 (SB154)
 voted in favor of increasing the sales tax by one percentage point to 6% - Tax Reform Act of 2007(HB2)

Death 
Lawton died of unknown causes on the morning of November 29, 2007 after giving a speech in downtown Washington. She was declared dead at George Washington Hospital Center. Her death appeared to be caused by a heart attack.

Jane was a longtime member and past President of the National Association of Telecommunications Officers and Advisors (NATOA). In 2008, NATOA created and awarded the first Jane E. Lawton Commemorative Award, presented yearly to an elected official who exemplifies what it means to promote community interests in communications.

The Jane Lawton internship was created to honor her memory through the President's Leadership Class.

References

Members of the Maryland House of Delegates
1944 births
2007 deaths
IBM employees
Women state legislators in Maryland
Burials at Rock Creek Cemetery
20th-century American politicians
20th-century American women politicians
21st-century American women